A number of world records (WR) and Olympic records (OR) were set in various skating events at the 2018 Winter Olympics in Pyeongchang, South Korea.

Figure skating

The following new ISU best scores were set during this competition:

Ice hockey

 On 13 February 2018, Jocelyne Lamoureux of the United States women's team scored two goals six seconds apart, an Olympic record for the shortest time between goals by any player.

 On 21 February 2018, Susanna Tapani of the Finnish women's team scored a goal ten seconds into the second period, an Olympic record for the shortest time for a goal scored after the beginning of a period.

Short track speed skating

Twelve Olympic records (OR) and three world records (WR) were set during the competition.

Speed skating

Eight Olympic records (OR) and five Sea level world bests (WB) were set during the competition.

References

External links

2018 Winter Olympics
2018 Winter Olympics